Anuradha Paudwal (born 27 October 1954) is an Indian playback singer who works predominantly in Hindi cinema. She has been described in media as one of the most prominent Bhajan singer and also as one of the most successful playback singers of 80s and 90s era of Bollywood. The recipient of several accolades including a National Film Award, four Filmfare Awards (winning consecutively during 1990–92) and two Odisha State Film Awards, she has been honoured by the Government of India with the Padma Shri, the country's fourth-highest civilian honour for her contribution in the field of arts.

She was honored with honorary degree of D.Litt. by D Y Patil University, the second singer to receive this degree after Lata Mangeshkar. She is engaged in social work and had a foundation named Suryodaya Foundation. In her career spanning over four decades Paudwal has recorded more than 9,000 songs and more than 1,500 bhajans in several languages including Gujarati, Hindi, Kannada, Marathi, Sanskrit, Bengali, Tamil, Telugu, Odia, Assamese, Punjabi, Bhojpuri, Nepali and Maithili. She is ranked NO. 31 in Youtube's Music Charts and Insights list of top global artist as of 3 February 2022. She has been on chart since last 237 weeks. She has been awarded a doctorate in music by DY Patil University felicitated by the house of commons in England and awarded the Cultural ambassador to Indian devotional by the United Nations in New York.

Career 
Paudwal made her debut from a Sanskrit verse in the 1973 Hindi film Abhiman, composed by S. D. Burman.
She has also sung in films including Marathi, Tamil, Odia, Nepali, Bengali and Kannada.

Early days and Success
She started her music journey in 1973 from film Abhiman. In 1970s, she sang a few popular songs which were praised by the music composers as well as public.

She obtained popularity from her song Tu Mera Janu Hai in film Hero. After that in mid-80s, she sang along with Mohammed Aziz and gave one after one hit songs and established herself in the music industry. It was the time when Anuradha Paudwal was given preference over Mangeshkar sisters.

Work with other singers
She started her music journey from 1973. She has worked with Kishore Kumar, Mohammed Rafi, S.P. Balasubrahmanyam, Yesudas, Manna Dey, Mohammed Aziz, Kumar Sanu, Udit Narayan, Sonu Nigam, Mukesh, Pankaj Udhas, Manhar Udhas, Suresh Wadkar, Nitin Mukesh, Abhijeet Bhattacharya and many other male singers.

She has worked with Kavita Krishnamurti, Alka Yagnik, Asha Bhosle and many other female singers.

In early 1990s, she gave one after one hit movies like Aashiqui, Dil Hai Ke Manta Nahin, Sadak, Dil, Beta, and Saajan. She established herself as a leading singer in music industry.
Her singing talent was recognised by the audience for the first time for the Marathi film, Yashoda, released in the same year. She received fame after her song Tu mera janu hai in film Hero. She was one of the most famous playback singers in 90s. She has sung for about four decades through the soundtrack of movie songs, lyrics and hymns. Anuradha Poudwal uses the money earned from the songs to help the families of soldiers who died in the war, to provide electricity to poor families and to solve the problem of malnutrition.

Legacy 
Paudwal has recorded 23 songs with the music composer Nadeem–Shravan. These songs were used in 3 films – Aashiqui, Dil Hai Ke Manta Nahin and Sadak. All three films were blockbusters, and for the songs, Anuradha Paudwal won two Filmfare Awards. Aashiqui is the third most selling album ever in Indian Music Industry. Dil Hai Ke Manta Nahin was 5th most selling soundtrack of 1991. Sadak was the third most selling album of 1991. These songs were released under the label T-Series.

Her chhath geet are extremely popular and has crossed 47 million views on YouTube. Her gayatri matra is immensely popular and crossed 220 million views on YouTube. Her Shiv Amritwani has become highly popular and has crossed 250 million views collectively on YouTube. Hanuman Amritwani recorded by her has crossed 450 million views on YouTube.  Shiv Bhajans and Durga bhajans sung by her are immensely popular in India.

She has sung thousands of songs in several languages. She has won four Filmfare Awards out of eleven nominations.

Television and albums Appearance 
Paudwal is one among the most popular singers in India. She has appeared in The Kapil Sharma Show as a guest along with Udit Narayan and Kumar Sanu. She has also appeared in popular singing show Indian Idol as a special guest where she share some of the memories of her career. Apart from this, She has also appeared in Sa Re Ga Ma Pa singing reality show. She has also appeared in Superstar Singer Season 2 singing reality show.

She has also appeared in many devotional albums like Shiv Amritwani,  Mamta Ka Mandir, Hanuman Amritwani and also has special appearances in various Bollywood Movies like Saathi, Hum Aapke Dil Mein Rehte Hain, Jai Maa Vaishno Devi.

Personal life 
She was born as Alka Nadkarni, in a Marathi speaking family in Karwar.
She was married to Arun Paudwal, a music composer, with whom she had a son Aditya and a daughter Kavita, a singer by profession. Anuradha survived a helicopter crash in 2002 in Madhya Pradesh. On 12 September 2020, her son Aditya died of kidney failure.

Awards and recognitions 
She has been honoured with many awards including 4 Filmfare Awards, 1 National Film Award and Padma Shri by Government of India. Her other accolades are as follows:
 2017: Padma Shri by Government of India
 2013: Mohammed Rafi Award by Government of Maharashtra
 2011: Mother Teresa Award for Lifetime Achievement
 2010: Lata Mangeshkar Award by the Madhya Pradesh Government

Filmfare Awards

Won
 1986: Best Female Playback Singer – "Mere Man Bajo Mridang" (Utsav)
 1991: Best Female Playback Singer – "Nazar Ke Saamne" (Aashiqui)
 1992: Best Female Playback Singer – "Dil Hai Ke Manta Nahin" (Dil Hai Ke Manta Nahin)
 1993: Best Female Playback Singer – "Dhak Dhak Karne Laga" (Beta)

Nominations
 1983: Best Female Playback Singer – "Maine Ek Geet Likha Hai" (Yeh Nazdeekiyan)
 1984: Best Female Playback Singer – "Tu Mera Hero Hain" (Hero (1983 film))
 1989: Best Female Playback Singer – "Keh Do Ki Tum" (Tezaab)
 1990: Best Female Playback Singer – "Tera Naam Liya" (Ram Lakhan)
 1990: Best Female Playback Singer – "Bekhabar Bewafa" (Ram Lakhan)
 1991: Best Female Playback Singer – "Mujhe Neend Na Aaye" (Dil)
 1992: Best Female Playback Singer – "Bahut Pyar Karte Hain " (Saajan)

National Film Awards

 1989:	Best Playback Singer (Female) – "He Ek Reshami" Kalat Nakalat (Marathi)

Odisha State Film Awards

 1987: Odisha State Film Award for Best Singer – Tunda Baida
 1997: Odisha State Film Award for Best Singer – Khandaei Akhi Re Luha

Guild Film Awards
 2004: Nominated for Apsara Award for Best Female Playback Singer

Others 
 She was honoured with D Litt degree by the D.Y. Patil University.
 The Citizen Award, which she received at the hand of late Shri Rajiv Gandhi in 1989 .
 The prestigious Mahila Shiromani award in 1993 at the hands of the first lady Smt. Vimal Sharma.
 Honoured with 'Mahakaal Award' by the Madhya Pradesh govt.2004

Discography

See also

 List of Indian playback singers
 List of bhajan singers
List of Padma Shri award recipients (2010–2019)

References

External links 

 
 List of Hindi movies with songs by Anuradha Paudwal

Bhajan singers
Bollywood playback singers
Living people
1954 births
Indian women playback singers
Indian women classical singers
20th-century Indian singers
21st-century Indian singers
20th-century Indian women singers
21st-century Indian women singers
Bengali-language singers
Kannada playback singers
Marathi playback singers
Marathi-language singers
Odia playback singers
Nepali-language singers from India
Punjabi-language singers
Tamil-language singers
Best Female Playback Singer National Film Award winners
Singers from Mumbai
Recipients of the Padma Shri in arts
Filmfare Awards winners